Sklyarenko is a Ukrainian-language family name.

The surname may refer to:

Alexei Sklyarenko (1870–1916), Russian revolutionary
Andrey Sklyarenko (born 1976), retired Khazakstani hurdler
Oksana Sklyarenko (born 1981), Ukrainian marathon runner

See also
 

Ukrainian-language surnames